The Good Soldier Švejk (the Germanised spelling Schweik is also used in English and other languages) is a common abbreviation of the title of the 1920s WW1 novel by Jaroslav Hašek as wall as an epithet of its eponymous anti-hero, Private Josef Švejk.

The Good Soldier Schweik may also refer to the following adaptations:
 The Good Soldier Schweik (1926 film), a silent film by Karel Lamač
 The Good Soldier Schweik (1931 film), a sound film by Martin Frič
 The Good Soldier Schweik (1955 film), an animated colour film by Jiří Trnka
 The Good Soldier Schweik (1956 film), a live-action colour film, first of two based on the novel
 The Good Soldier Schweik (1960 film), a German film
 The Good Soldier Schweik, an instrumental suite by Robert Kurka (1956–1958, expanded into a 1957 opera)

See also
 The Good Soldier (disambiguation)